Zeppelin mail was mail carried on zeppelins, the German airships that saw civilian use from 1908 to 1939. Almost every zeppelin flight carried mail, sometimes in large quantities; the covers usually received special postmarks, and a number of nations issued postage stamps specifically intended for use on mail carried by the zeppelins.

First period, 1908 to 1914 
The first zeppelin to carry mail was LZ 4, in July 1908, followed shortly by LZ 3. The early flights did not use any special markings; the first was an oval reading "LUFTSCHIFF / SIGNALPOST" around the edge and "Z III" in the center, used on LZ 6 (Z 3) from August to October 1909. By 1911 a number of different postmarks were in use; a typical example was a circle reading "AN BORD DES / ZEPPELIN / LUFTSCHIFFES", with a date in the center and the name of the zeppelin at bottom. These were actually applied on board the zeppelin while in flight, at a small postal station.

The zeppelins were taken into military service in 1914, and thereafter did not carry civilian mail, although military commanders had special handstamps applied to their mail.

Inter-war period, 1919 to 1939 
In late 1919, LZ 120 Bodensee resumed flights and mail carriage, using postmarks much as before the war, until 1921 when it was given to Italy as a war reparation. LZ 126 carried mail briefly in 1924 before it was delivered to the United States and renamed the Los Angeles (ZR-3).  The Los Angeles carried mail between Lakehurst, New Jersey, Bermuda, and Mayagüez, Puerto Rico several times.

LZ 127 Graf Zeppelin had a long and celebrated career. Within weeks of its first flight in September 1928, the Graf Zeppelin carried the first airmail to go directly from Germany to the US and vice versa. Germany issued special 2-mark and 4-mark stamps for the occasion. On the return trip, the zeppelin carried almost 52,000 postcards and 50,000 letters. In 1929, Graf Zeppelin circled the globe, with stops in Tokyo and Los Angeles. By the time it was taken out of service in June 1937, the zeppelin had made 590 flights, each flight carrying up to 12 tons of mail to and from dozens of countries around the world.

Although LZ 129 Hindenburg is most famous for its fiery end, for the 14 months of its existence, it carried considerable amounts of mail overseas, and many of those are readily available today. Most of the 17,609 pieces of mail on the last flight were destroyed in the fire, but a handful were recovered, and today are highly prized crash covers.

The LZ 130 Graf Zeppelin II was the last of the zeppelins to carry mail; it was in civilian service for only a few months, from October 1938 to August 1939, and made only 30 trips, all within Germany.

Zeppelin stamps

Zeppelin stamps were issued by a few countries to pay the postage for mail carried on Zeppelin flights during the late 1920s and early 1930s when Zeppelins flew passengers and mail from Germany to other countries and on return flights. Some stamps were regular issues overprinted while other were specially designed.

See also
 1930 Graf Zeppelin stamps of the United States
 LZ 127 Graf Zeppelin
 Airship
 Zeppelin

Notes, references and sources
Notes

References

Sources
 Zeppelinpost Spezial-Katalog (Sieger) (in German)

Further reading 
eZEP.de — The webportal for Zeppelin mail and airship memorabilia
Zeppelin Study Group — Research group for airship memorabilia and Zeppelin mail
Zeppelin Post Journal — Quarterly publication for Zeppelin mail and airship memorabilia

Airmail
Mail
Postal history